The 2016–17 Copa Argentina (officially the Copa Total Argentina 2016-17 for sponsorship reasons) was the eighth edition of the Copa Argentina, and the sixth since the relaunch of the tournament in 2011. The competition began on February 2 and ended on December 9, 2017.

River Plate, the defending champions, defeated Atlético Tucumán 2–1 in the Final to win their 2nd title. As champions, River Plate qualified for the 2017 Supercopa Argentina.

Atlético Tucumán, as runners-up, qualified for the 2018 Copa Libertadores because River Plate had already qualified as Primera División runners-up.

Teams 
Ninety-nine teams took part in this competition: All teams from the Primera División (30); twelve teams of the Primera B Nacional; five from the Primera B, four from the Primera C; two from the Primera D; fourteen teams from Federal A and thirty-two from Federal B.

First Level

Primera División 
All thirty teams qualified.

  Aldosivi
  Arsenal
  Atlético de Rafaela
  Atlético Tucumán
  Banfield
  Belgrano
  Boca Juniors
  Colón
  Defensa y Justicia
  Estudiantes (LP)
  Gimnasia y Esgrima (LP)
  Godoy Cruz
  Huracán
  Independiente
  Lanús
  Newell's Old Boys
  Olimpo
  Patronato
  Quilmes
  Racing
  River Plate
  Rosario Central
  San Lorenzo
  San Martín (SJ)
  Sarmiento (J)
  Talleres (C)
  Temperley
  Tigre
  Unión
  Vélez Sarsfield

Second Level 
The first twelve teams from the first stage of 2016-17 tournament qualified.

Primera B Nacional 

  All Boys
  Almagro
  Argentinos Juniors
  Brown
  Central Córdoba (SdE)
  Chacarita Juniors
  Ferro Carril Oeste
  Guillermo Brown
  Independiente Rivadavia
  Instituto
  Nueva Chicago
  Santamarina

Third Level

Primera B Metropolitana 
The first five teams from the first stage of 2016-17 Primera B tournament qualified.

  Atlanta
  Defensores de Belgrano
  Deportivo Morón
  Deportivo Riestra
  Estudiantes (BA)

Torneo Federal A 
The first two teams of each zone of the 2016–17 tournament qualified.

  Altos Hornos Zapla
  Alvarado
  Chaco For Ever
  Cipolletti
  Defensores de Belgrano (VR)
  Deportivo Madryn
  Gimnasia y Esgrima (M)
  Gimnasia y Tiro
  Mitre (SdE)
  Sarmiento (R)
  Sportivo Las Parejas
  Unión Aconquija
  Unión (S)
  Unión (VK)

Fourth Level

Primera C Metropolitana 
The first four teams from the first stage of 2016-17 Primera C tournament qualified.

  Cañuelas
  Defensores Unidos
  Sacachispas
  Sportivo Barracas

Torneo Federal B 
The first two teams of each zone of the 2016-17 Federal B tournament qualified.

  Almirante Brown (L)
  Argentinos (VdM)
  Atlético Laguna Blanca
  Belgrano (P)
  Belgrano (SN)
  Bella Vista (BB)
  Ben Hur
  Central Norte
  Colón Juniors
  Comercio Central Unidos
  Deportivo Achirense
  Deportivo Camioneros
  Estudiantes (RC)
  Ferroviario (C)
  Germinal
  Güemes (SdE)
  Huracán (CR)
  Huracán Las Heras
  Independiente (Ch)
  Jorge Newbery (CR)
  Kimberley
  Mitre (S)
  Pacífico
  San Martín (F)
  Sansinena
  Sol de Mayo
  Sportivo Barracas (C)
  Sportivo Peñarol (Ch)
  Talleres (P)
  Textil Mandiyú
  Tiro Federal (M)
  Tiro Federal (R)

Fifth Level

Primera D Metropolitana 
The first two teams from the first stage of 2016-17 Primera D tournament qualified.

  Atlas
  Leandro N. Alem

Regional Round 
This round is organized by the Consejo Federal.

Group A: Federal A 
In this round, 14 teams from the Torneo Federal A participated. The round was played between March 14 and March 30, on a home-and-away two-legged tie. The 7 winning teams advanced to the Final Round.

|-

|-

|-

|-

|-

|-

|-

|}

First leg

Second leg

Group B: Federal B

Round I 
In this first round, 32 teams from the Torneo Federal B participated. The round was played between  February 2 and February 23, on a home-and-away two-legged tie. The 16 winning teams advanced to the Round II.

|-

|-

|-

|-

|-

|-

|-

|-

|-

|-

|-

|-

|-

|-

|-

|-

|}

First leg

Second leg

Round II 

In this round, 16 qualified teams from the Round I participated. The round was played between February 11 and March 5, on a home-and-away two-legged tie. The 8 winning teams advanced to the Round III.

|-

|-

|-

|-

|-

|-

|-

|-

|}

First leg

Second leg

Round III 
In this round, 8 qualified teams from the Round I participated. The round was played between February 18 and March 18, on a home-and-away two-legged tie. The 4 winning teams advanced to the Final Round.

|-

|-

|-

|-

|}

First leg

Second leg

Final Round

Bracket

Upper bracket

Lower bracket

Round of 64 
This round had 11 qualified teams from the Regional Round (7 teams from Torneo Federal A and 4 teams from Torneo Federal B), 11 qualified teams from the Metropolitan Zone (5 teams from Primera B Metro; 4 teams from Primera C and 2 teams from Primera D), 12 teams from Primera B Nacional and 30 teams from Primera División. The round was played between April 25 and August 18, in a single knock-out match format. The 32 winning teams advanced to the Round of 32. The draw took place on April 5, 2017.

Round of 32 
This round had the 32 qualified teams from the Round of 64. The round was played between August 16 and September 21, in a single knock-out match format. The 16 winning teams advanced to the Round of 16.

Round of 16 
This round had the 16 qualified teams from the Round of 32. The round was played between September 27 and October 9, in a single knock-out match format. The 8 winning teams advanced to the Quarterfinals.

Quarterfinals 
This round had the 8 qualified teams from the Round of 16. The round was played between October 18 and October 24, in a single knock-out match format. The 4 winning teams advanced to the Semifinals.

Semifinals 
This round had the 4 qualified teams from the Quarterfinals. The round was played on November 10 and 12, in a single knock-out match format. The 2 winning teams advanced to the Final.

Final

Top goalscorers

Team of the tournament

See also
2017–18 Argentine Primera División

References

External links 
 Official site 
 Copa Argentina on the Argentine Football Association's website 

2016
Argentina
2016 in Argentine football
2017 in Argentine football